Porter Wagoner and Skeeter Davis Sing Duets is a studio album by American country artists, Porter Wagoner and Skeeter Davis. It was released in May 1962 on RCA Victor and contained 12 tracks. The album was collection of duet recordings between both performers. A total of 12 tracks comprised the album, most of which were covers of songs first recorded by other music artists. The album was given positive reviews at the time of its release.

Background and content
Both Porter Wagoner and Skeeter Davis both had successful solo careers in the country genre. Both were also signed to the RCA Victor label. Wagoner first gained an RCA contract in the mid 1950s and had first top ten single with 1955's "A Satisfied Mind". Wagoner continued having charting singles, but did not become more successful until the early sixties when his own television show became successful. Skeeter Davis was formerly one half of the duo, The Davis Sisters. After a car accident that killed the duo's second member, Davis began a successful solo career with RCA. In the late 1950s and early sixties, she reached the country top ten with songs like "Set Him Free" and "My Last Date (With You)".

Wagoner and Davis first collaborated together for the album's recording. It was produced by Chet Atkins, who both recorded the artists in their individual careers at RCA. The sessions for the album took place in February 1962 at RCA Victor Studios, located in Nashville, Tennessee. The entire project was a collection of duets between the pair. Most of its tracks were covers of previously-recorded country songs. Among them was The Davis Sisters's original "Rock-A-Bye Boogie". Among the album's other cover tunes were "Have I Told You Lately That I Love You", "Gonna Find Me a Bluebird" and "A Little Bitty Tear".

Release and reception
Porter Wagoner and Skeeter Davis Sing Duets was originally released in May 1962 on the RCA Victor label. It was originally distributed as a vinyl LP, containing six recordings on either side of the record. Upon its release, the album was given critical attention by Billboard magazine. In June 1962, the publication named it among its "Spotlight Albums of the Week". Critics noted the album's mix of traditional country along with a defined "string section". The further added, "Their singing is first-rate and sure to score with country buyers." The publication also highlighted the album track "Above and Beyond" on a separate page of the same issue. 

One single was issued in the original release: "Rock-A-Bye Boogie". The single was issued through RCA Victor in Germany. In 2013, the album was re-released in a digital format via Rockabilly Records. The re-release consisted of a different track listing than the original LP version. In 2017, the album was re-released again as a vinyl LP. Instead however, it was issued in The Netherlands through the Vinyl Passion label. A different track listing was also included and bonus tracks were added.

Track listings

Vinyl version

Digital version

Vinyl re-release

Release history

References

1962 albums
Albums produced by Chet Atkins
RCA Victor albums
Skeeter Davis albums
Porter Wagoner albums
Vocal duet albums